A carbon–carbon bond is a covalent bond between two carbon atoms. The most common form is the single bond: a bond composed of two electrons, one from each of the two atoms. The carbon–carbon single bond is a sigma bond and is formed between one hybridized orbital from each of the carbon atoms. In ethane, the orbitals are sp3-hybridized orbitals, but single bonds formed between carbon atoms with other hybridizations do occur (e.g. sp2 to sp2). In fact, the carbon atoms in the single bond need not be of the same hybridization. Carbon atoms can also form double bonds in compounds called alkenes or triple bonds in compounds called alkynes. A double bond is formed with an sp2-hybridized orbital and a p-orbital that is not involved in the hybridization. A triple bond is formed with an sp-hybridized orbital and two p-orbitals from each atom. The use of the p-orbitals forms a pi bond.

Chains and branching 
Carbon is one of the few elements that can form long chains of its own atoms, a property called catenation. This coupled with the strength of the carbon–carbon bond gives rise to an enormous number of molecular forms, many of which are important structural elements of life, so carbon compounds have their own field of study: organic chemistry.

Branching is also common in C−C skeletons. Carbon atoms in a molecule are categorized by the number of carbon neighbors they have:
 A primary carbon has one carbon neighbor.
 A secondary carbon has two carbon neighbors.
 A tertiary carbon has three carbon neighbors.
 A quaternary carbon has four carbon neighbors.

In "structurally complex organic molecules", it is the three-dimensional orientation of the carbon–carbon bonds at quaternary loci which dictates the shape of the molecule.  Further, quaternary loci are found in many biologically active small molecules, such as cortisone and morphine.

Synthesis
Carbon–carbon bond-forming reactions are organic reactions in which a new carbon–carbon bond is formed. They are important in the production of many man-made chemicals such as pharmaceuticals and plastics.

Some examples of reactions which form carbon–carbon bonds are the aldol reaction, Diels–Alder reaction, Grignard reaction, cross-coupling reactions, the Michael reaction and the Wittig reaction.

The directed synthesis of desired three-dimensional structures for tertiary carbons was largely solved during the late 20th century, but the same ability to direct quaternary carbon synthesis did not start to emerge until the first decade of the 21st century.

Bond strengths and lengths
The carbon-carbon single bond is weaker than C-H, O-H, N-H, H-H, H-Cl, C-F, and many double or triple bonds, and comparable in strength to C-O, Si-O, P-O, and S-H bonds, but is commonly considered as strong.

The values given above represent C-C bond dissociation energies that are commonly encountered; occasionally, outliers may deviate drastically from this range.

Extreme cases

Long, weak C-C single bonds
Various extreme cases have been identified where the C-C bond is elongated.  In Gomberg's dimer, one C-C bond is rather long at 159.7 picometers.  It is this bond that reversibly and readily breaks at room temperature in solution: 

In the even more congested molecule hexakis(3,5-di-tert-butylphenyl)ethane, the bond dissociation energy to form the stabilized triarylmethyl radical is only 8 kcal/mol. Also a consequence of its severe steric congestion, hexakis(3,5-di-tert-butylphenyl)ethane has a greatly elongated central bond with a length of 167 pm.

Twisted, weak C-C double bonds
The structure of tetrakis(dimethylamino)ethylene (TDAE) is highly distorted. The dihedral angle for the two N2C ends is 28º although the C=C distance is normal 135 pm. The nearly isostructural tetraisopropylethylene also has a C=C distance of 135 pm, but its C6 core is planar.

Short, strong C-C triple bonds
On the opposite extreme, the central carbon–carbon single bond of diacetylene is very strong at 160 kcal/mol, as the single bond joins two carbons of sp hybridization. Carbon–carbon multiple bonds are generally stronger; the double bond of ethylene and triple bond of acetylene have been determined to have bond dissociation energies of 174 and 230 kcal/mol, respectively. A very short triple bond of 115 pm has been observed for the iodonium species [HC≡C–I+Ph][CF3SO3–], due to the strongly electron-withdrawing iodonium moiety.

See also 
Carbon–hydrogen bond
Carbon–oxygen bond
Carbon–nitrogen bond

References

Organic chemistry
Chemical bonding